Rhyncogonus bryani is an extinct species of beetle in the family Curculionidae. It was endemic to the United States.

References

Entiminae
Taxonomy articles created by Polbot
Beetles described in 1919